Margaret Butler may refer to:
 Lady Margaret Butler (died 1539), Irish noblewoman
 Margaret F. Butler (1861–1931), American physician and professor
 Margaret FitzGerald, Countess of Ormond (died 1542), Irish noblewoman with the married name Butler
 Margaret K. Butler (1924–2013), American mathematician who specialized in early computer software 
 Margaret Butler (sculptor) (1883–1947), New Zealand sculptor